The Libya national football team represents Libya in men's international association football and it is controlled by the Libyan Football Federation. The team has never qualified for FIFA World Cups in history but has qualified for three Africa Cup of Nations: 1982, 2006, and 2012. In 1982, the team was both the host and runner-up. In the Arab Cup, Libya finished second in 1964 and 2012, and third in 1966. The team is affiliated with both FIFA and Confederation of African Football (CAF).

Due to political circumstances, Libya has typically been less successful in international competition compared to other North African teams like Algeria, Morocco, Egypt and Tunisia. Libya has never qualified for the FIFA World Cup and its participation in AFCON is sporadic, having only qualified for three AFCON editions.

Since 2010s, Libya's global ranking has improved due to the increasing number of Libyan players playing in foreign leagues. In the 2012 Africa Cup of Nations, the team recorded their first-ever win in the tournament outside Libya. Their FIFA world ranking rose to a high of 36 in September 2012; Libya then won a gold medal in the 2014 African Nations Championship. However, the Libyan Civil War caused the stoppage of the Libyan Premier League and severely disrupted domestic affairs. Libya was eliminated in the first round of the 2015 Africa Cup of Nations qualification by Rwanda and failed to qualify for the 2016 African Nations Championship as the defending champions.

History

Early history
Libya's national team was first initiated in 1918, but did not play an official international until 3 August 1953, when they defeated Palestine 5–2 in the first Pan Arab Games in 1953. The team's first manager was Masoud Zantouny, and the first foreign manager was Englishman James Bingham, who took charge of the Libyan national team for the 1961 Pan Arab Games. The first player ever to score for the Libyan national team in an official international was Mukhtar Ghonaay.

The first penalty ever scored by a member of the national team was in the 1953 Pan Arab Games group stage; in the match against Egypt, Ali Zantouny scored in the 3–2 defeat. The national team's first participation in the Arab Cup was in 1964, the second edition of the competition, held in Kuwait.

The first ever player to score for the Libyan national team in a non-official international was Mustapha Makki in a warm-up friendly played prior to the 1953 Pan Arab Games tournament, played against Palestine in Alexandria in 1952. The national team's first attempt to qualify for an Olympic football tournament was in 1967, where they played their first qualification match against Niger in an attempt to qualify for the 1968 Olympic football tournament in Mexico City.

World Cups
Libya first entered the FIFA World Cup qualifiers in 1970. Their early attempts failed, but during the 1980s the national side strengthened. The country's geopolitical position, however, affected the football team, who had to withdraw from qualifying for the 1982 and 1990 World Cups.

Libya came closest to qualifying for the World Cup in 1986. They came to within a game of reaching the finals in Mexico. After winning their match against Sudan in their first game, the Libyans beat Ghana in the next round before taking on Morocco for a place at the finals. Morocco won the first game 3–0 and went through, even though Libya won the return leg 1–0.

After not entering the 1994 and 1998 FIFA World Cup competition, Libya came back in the qualifying competition for Korea/Japan. The Libyans advanced to the second round at the expense of Mali, who were beaten 4–3 on aggregate. In the group stage, Libya managed only two draws in eight games.

In the qualifying for the 2006 FIFA World Cup, a 9–0 two-legged victory against São Tome and Principe put the Libyans through to the group stage. Libyan player Al-Saadi Gaddafi was banned from the team after failing drug test.

A difficult group followed containing Egypt, Cameroon and Ivory Coast, the eventual group winners and qualifiers for the World Cup. However, The Knights were able to secure good results against these sides, as they beat Egypt 2–1 in Tripoli, and held Cameroon and Ivory Coast to 0–0 draws, helping them to a 4th-place finish and a place at the 2006 African Cup of Nations finals in Egypt.

During the qualifying campaign for the 2010 FIFA World Cup, Libya defeated each side in the second round during home matches (they also defeated Lesotho away). However they were defeated by Gabon in an away match, and failed to qualify to the next round on goal difference.

In the qualifying campaign for the 2014 FIFA World Cup, Libya reached the final match in the group stage without a defeat. They were defeated 1–0 by Cameroon and failed to advance to the final round.

In the qualifying campaign for the 2018 FIFA World Cup, Libya defeated Rwanda 4–1 on aggregate in the second round but were eliminated after losing the first three matches in the group stages.

African Cup Of Nations

Libya 1982
The biggest football tournament to be held in Libya was the 1982 African Cup of Nations. Libya qualified automatically as hosts and were put in a group alongside Ghana, Cameroon and Tunisia. The opening match of the tournament saw the hosts take on Ghana in Tripoli in a 2–2 draw. A 2–0 win over Tunisia and a goalless draw against Cameroon saw Libya topping the group.

In the semi-finals, Libya came from behind to beat Zambia 2–1 and set up another match with Ghana, this time in the final on 19 March. Ghana scored first in the 35th minute, but Libya equalised in the 70th. This was followed by a tense period of extra time in which no goals were scored. In a long penalty shootout, Ghana came out triumphant 7–6.

Egypt 2006
Libya's second African Cup of Nations saw a return to the higher levels of the international footballing scene at the 2006 African Cup of Nations finals in Egypt. They qualified for the competition after a goalless draw with Sudan in their ninth qualifying match.

Libya were drawn in Group A with Egypt (the hosts and eventual winners), 2006 World Cup-qualifiers Ivory Coast and Morocco. Libya lost 3–0 to Egypt in Cairo, then lost 2–1 to Ivory Coast. A goalless draw against Morocco saw Libya finish bottom of the group.

Post-Gaddafi era
Libya played its first match after the Battle of Tripoli (and thus the end of the Gaddafi era in Libya) on 3 September 2011, with a new uniform sporting the National Transitional Council flag of Libya.

The match, part of the 2012 Africa Cup of Nations qualification campaign, resulted in a 1–0 victory over Mozambique. The historic goal was scored by Rabee'a al Laafi. Like Libya's previous home match, a 3–0 defeat of Comoros in qualifying, played in Stade 26 mars in Bamako, Mali, a relocation was necessary due to the ongoing Libyan Civil War, and so the Petro Sport Stadium in Cairo, Egypt became the venue. The match was played behind closed doors for security reasons.

Prior to the team's final game in the qualification campaign, against Zambia, coach Marcos Paquetá claimed that the team was now "not only playing for football success but for a new government and a new country". The match was played on 8 October 2011, and resulted in a 0–0 draw which was good enough for both teams to qualify. Paquetá and his team danced and celebrated afterwards.

In November 2011 the team travelled to the United Arab Emirates to play a friendly match against Belarus organized by FIFA and broadcast Dubai Sports. The team members, along with the Libyan national chess team, also attended an event at the Libyan Consulate in Dubai organized to honour their contribution to their country in the field of sports.

On 7 June 2013, Libya met DR Congo in its first match on home ground in two years.

2012 Africa Cup of Nations
Having qualified, Libya were drawn into Group A with co-hosts Equatorial Guinea, qualification rivals Zambia and pre-tournament favourites Senegal.

The Mediterranean Knights' first game, the tournament's opening match, saw them lose to an 87th-minute winner from ex-Real Madrid winger Javier Ángel Balboa. Libya went on to secure a 2–2 draw with Zambia in terrible conditions at the Estadio de Bata, before two goals from Ihaab al Bousseffi guided them to a 2–1 victory over Senegal, their first Nations Cup win in 30 years and a first on foreign soil. After four points from three games Libya was eliminated at the group stage.

2014 African Nations Championship Final

Libya played Ghana in the 2014 CHAN final. Extra time was given (two 15 minutes), however both teams failed to score. It was taken to penalty shootouts, where the Libyan team scored the first three penalties, missed two others and scored the final sixth and their Ghanaian opponents missed the first two, scored the next three then missed the final sixth penalty (resulting in 3 penalties scored). The match finished (0–0) and was won by the Mediterranean Knights by penalties (4–3).

Coaching crisis

After Javier Clemente's dismissal in 2016, Jalal Damja took over the national team. He left in 2017 after his contract expired. Omar Almaryami was later appointed as coach and led Libya to the semi-finals of the 2018 African Nations Championship. After Libya's elimination by Morocco, Adel Amrouche was appointed in May 2018. His goal was to help Libya qualify for the 2019 Africa Cup of Nations. He led Libya to a 0–0 draw against South Africa away from home. However, days before Libya's match against Nigeria, Amrouche suddenly left the team's camp and later resigned. During an interview with Reuters, Amrouche said that the reason for his resignation was that the Libyan Football Federation was repeatedly interfering with his work as a coach. He also cited unpaid wages as a reason for his resignation.

Omar Almaryami was again appointed as a caretaker coach of Libya. The team lost twice to Nigeria (4–0 away, 3–2 home) and Almaryami was replaced by former striker Fawzi Al-Issawi, who led Libya to an 8–1 away win over Seychelles. However, Libya later lost to South Africa 2–1, and Libya failed to qualify for the 2019 Africa Cup of Nations. It was noted during the match that al-Issawi's assistant, Abu Bakr Bani was the one who made substitutions and instructed players, leaving many to wonder who was the actual coach.

After the match against South Africa, Jalal Damja was reappointed as the head coach for temporary matches in the 2021 Africa Cup of Nations qualification before Faouzi Benzarti was named as new coach of Libya. Under Benzarti, Libya opened their campaign with a disastrous 1–4 loss to Tunisia, the home of Benzarti, before managed to salvage an important 2–1 win over Tanzania to gain hope for qualifying to an AFCON tournament since 2012. Yet, managerial crisis once again erupted when Benzarti left the team and Libya had to appoint a local coach, Ali El Margini, in charge against Equatorial Guinea, a team that had not won a single game in the qualification. Internal instability proved to be a rupture, as Libya lost two consecutive games against the Central African opponent and fell out of top two position. El Margini left after losing all three of his games in charge. He was replaced by Zoran Filipović, who led a team of domestic players into the 2020 African Nations Championship. Libya were eliminated in the group stage after two draws and a loss in three games. Defeats in their final two AFCON qualifiers saw Filipovic sacked in May 2021. Javier Clemente was reappointed as head coach shortly afterwards.

Kits

In the Gaddafi era the National team used to play its home matches wearing the green coloured kit representing the Flag of Libyan Arab Jamahiriya. However, after the Libyan Civil War in 2011, Libya changed its flag to the new one which was used from 1951 to 1969 back when Libya was a Kingdom. This change resulted in changing the national team's kit in order to represent the new flag.  The team played its home matches with colours: Red, Black and Green (as in the flag). Red dominates the strip and is the sole jersey colour.  The away colours were white in both eras. Since 2011, the LFF emblem and the national team's badge was changed into the current design. The previous badge was two balls in front of green coloured Libya's map which is also in front of a sun.

During late 2011 and early 2012 the Libyan team wore white jerseys temporarily in their qualification games and 2012 Africa Cup of Nations. However, in mid-2012 the team began to use red jerseys.
In 2014, Libya replaced the green socks worn by the players with black ones.

Adidas is the supplier of the official team strip.

Home stadium

The Tripoli Stadium is a multi-purpose stadium in Tripoli, Libya. It can hold 80,000 spectators.

It was the main venue used by the Libyan national football team in its FIFA World Cup and African Nations Cup qualifying matches as well as friendlies and other international games.

The stadium hosted many games of the 1982 African Cup of Nations held in Libya along with the 28 March Stadium in Benghazi.

The 28 March Stadium in Benghazi was also used by the national team sometimes.

FIFA lifted the ban on Libyan stadiums in 2013, during the 2014 FIFA World Cup qualification. However, it was re-imposed in 2014 due to increased security concerns. The Libyan national team was forced to host games in neighboring countries such as Algeria, Morocco, Egypt or Tunisia (Tunisia the most popular choice due to its close distance to Libya).

Libya played their first home game since 2013 at the Martyrs of February Stadium in Benghazi against Tunisia on 25 March 2021.

Rivalries
Libya's only real rivalries are with its fellow North African footballing nations, Algeria, Morocco, Egypt and, mainly, Tunisia. Matches between Libya and any one of these opponents are highly charged encounters. Libya defeated Egypt 2–1 in a World Cup qualifier on 8 October 2004, the Pharaohs only managed to beat the Libyans on their own turf once. The rivalry was rekindled at the 2007 Pan Arab Games, where the teams drew 0–0; Egypt eventually claimed the gold medal on goal difference from the Libyans.

Libya also has a rivalry with Morocco. Libya's last win against Morocco was during the 1986 World Cup qualifiers, which Libya won 1–0.  A friendly was played between both countries on the 11th of October 2019 in which they tied. Matches between Libya and Tunisia are also very tense, the last time they played was a 5-2 win from the latter in the African Cup of Nations qualification group stage round.

Recent schedule and results

The following is a list of match results from the previous 12 months, as well as any future matches that have been scheduled.

2022

2023

Coaching history

 Massoud Zantouny (1953)
 Salim Faraj Balteb (1957–1960)
 James Benjeham (1961)
 Billy Elliott (1961–1963)
 Vojin Božović (1964–1965)
 George Skinner (1965–1966)
 Mokhtar Arribi (1966–1967)
 Keith Spurgeon (1967–1968)
 Ali Zantouny (1968–1969)
 Milan Selbetishi (1969–1970)
 George Ainsley (1970–1971)
 Nicolae Oaidă (1971–1972)
 Hassan Al-Amer (1972)
 Titus Ozon (1972–1974)
 Mohammed El-Khamisi (1974–1975)
 Abed Ali Al-Aqili (1975–1976)
 Mohammed El-Khamisi (1976–1977)
 Ali Al-Zaqori (1977–1978)
 Ron Bradley (1978–1980)
 Mohammed El-Khamisi (1980–1982)
 Béla Gutal (1982)
 Cicerone Manolache (1983–1984)
 Mohammed El-Khamisi (1984)
 Hashimi El-Bahlul (1984–1986)
 Mohammed El-Khamisi (1988–1989)
 Ahmed Ben Soueid (1989)
 Hashimi El-Bahlul (1991–1997)
 Ion Moldovan (1998)
 Danny McLennan (1998)
 Eugenio Bersellini (1998–1999)
 Carlos Bilardo (1999–2000)
 Miguel Angel Lemme (2000–2001)
 Francesco Scoglio (2002)
 Ilija Lončarević (2003–2004)
 Mohammed El-Khamisi (2004–2005)
 Ilija Lončarević (2005–2006)
 Mohsen Saleh (2006)
 Abou Bakr Bani (2006–2007)
 Faouzi Benzarti (2007–2009)
 Branko Ivanković (2009–2010)
 Marcos Paquetá (2010–2012)
 Abdul-Hafeedh Arbeesh (2012–2013)
 Javier Clemente (2013–2016)
 Jalal Damja (2016–2017)
 Adel Amrouche (2017–2018)
 Fawzi Al-Issawi (2018–2019)
 Jalal Damja (2019)
 Faouzi Benzarti (2019–2020)
 Ali El Margini (2020)
 Zoran Filipović (2020–2021)
 Javier Clemente (2021–2022)
 Ramon Catala (2022)
 Corentin Martins (2022–2023)
 Hamdi Bataw (2023–)

Players

Current squad
The following players were selected for two friendly matches against Niger on 26 March .

Recent call ups
The following players have been called up to the Libya squad in the last 12 months.

Records

Players in bold are still active with Libya.

Most appearances

Top goalscorers

Competitive record

FIFA World Cup record

Olympic Games record

Football at the Summer Olympics has been an under-23 tournament since the 1992 edition.

Africa Cup of Nations record

All-Africa Games record

 Prior to the Cairo 1991 campaign, the Football at the All-Africa Games was open to full senior national teams.
  Libya was disqualified from the tournament due to violence with the Egyptian team during the match in the group stage.

African Nations Championship record

Mediterranean Games record

Prior to the Athens 1991 campaign, the Football at the Mediterranean Games was open to full senior national teams.

FIFA Arab Cup record

Pan Arab Games record

Palestine Cup of Nations record

Honours
Africa Cup of Nations
Runners-up (1): 1982
Arab Cup
Runners-up (2): 1964, 2012
Third place (1): 1966
African Nations Championship
Champions (1): 2014

See also
1986 FIFA World Cup qualification (CAF) (The closest Libya came to qualifying for the World Cup).

Notes

References

External links

Libyan Football Federation 
African Cup Of Nations 82

 
African national association football teams
1918 establishments in Libya